The 1935 World Table Tennis Championships mixed doubles was the ninth edition of the mixed doubles championship.  

Viktor Barna and Anna Sipos defeated Stanislav Kolář and Marie Kettnerová in the final by three sets to one.

Results

See also
List of World Table Tennis Championships medalists

References

-